Deadly Maneuvers may refer to:

Deadly Maneuvers (Knight Rider episode)
Deadly Maneuvers, episode of The A-Team